The 2016 Big Ten Conference Men's Ice Hockey Tournament was the third tournament in conference history played between March 17 and March 19, 2016 at Xcel Energy Center in Saint Paul, Minnesota. The winner of the tournament was the Michigan Wolverines, who earned the Big Ten's automatic bid to the 2016 NCAA Division I Men's Ice Hockey Tournament.

Format
All six Big Ten teams participated in the tournament, which was a single-elimination format. Teams were seeded No. 1 through No. 6 according to the final regular season conference standings. In the quarterfinals, No. 3 played No. 6 and No. 4 played No. 5. In the semifinals, No. 2 played the winner of the first game and No. 1 played the winner of the second game (the teams are not reseeded). The two semifinal winners played each other in the Championship Game.

Conference standings
Note: GP = Games played; W = Wins; L = Losses; T = Ties; PTS = Points; GF = Goals For; GA = Goals Against

Bracket

Note: * denotes overtime periods.

Quarterfinals
All times are local (CT) (UTC−5).

(3) Penn State vs. (6) Wisconsin

(4) Ohio State vs. (5) Michigan State

Semifinals

(2) Michigan vs. (3) Penn State

(1) Minnesota vs. (4) Ohio State

Championship

(1) Minnesota vs. (2) Michigan

Tournament awards

Most Outstanding Player
 Forward: Kyle Connor (Michigan)

All-Tournament Team
 Goaltender: Steve Racine (Michigan)
 Defensemen: Zach Werenski (Michigan), Luke Juha (Penn State)
 Forwards: J. T. Compher (Michigan), Kyle Connor (Michigan), Tyler Sheehy (Minnesota)

References

External links
 Big Ten Tournament information

Big Ten Men's Ice Hockey Tournament
Big Ten Men's Ice Hockey Tournament